Goema, also written Ghomma and Gomma, is a type of hand drum used in the Cape Minstrel Carnival and in Cape Jazz in Cape Town. The word has also come to describe a hybrid musical genre which itself is one of the influences on Cape Jazz music. Notabe goema musicians include Mac McKenzie, Hilton Schilder, Errol Dyers and Alex van Heerden.

References

African drums
Hand drums
Jazz instruments
South African musical instruments
South African styles of music